Tavka Kurgan is an ancient fortress and archaeological site near Shirabad, Uzbekistan. It is especially famous for some frescoes dated to the 5th-6th century CE, several of them located in the Archaeological Museum of Termez. One of these paintings, the so-called "Princess of Tokharistan", is actually thought to represent a hunter.

The paintings of Tavka Kurgan were excavated by the Uzek archaeologist Šojmardon Raxmanov. They are of very high quality, and are closely related to other paintings of the Tokharistan school such as Balalyk tepe, Adžina-tepe and Kala-i Kafirnigan, in the depiction of clothes, and especially in the treatment of the faces.

See also
 Dilberjin Tepe

References

Sources

 

Central Asia
Archaeology of Uzbekistan
Archaeological sites in Uzbekistan
Former populated places in Uzbekistan
Kushan Empire